Varlam Cherkezishvili (15 September 1846 – 18 August 1925), also known as Warlaam Tcherkesoff or Varlam Nikolaevich Cherkezov in Russian manner, was a Georgian aristocrat and journalist involved in anarchist movement and Georgian national liberation movement.

Cherkezov was born in Tbilisi as a Georgian prince. During the anarchist Peter Kropotkin's exile in London, Cherkezov was his closest confidant. Around 1907, he helped organize the London Anarchist Red Cross to aid political prisoners alongside Peter Kropotkin, Rudolf Rocker and Alexander Schapiro. Cherkezov joined Kropotkin in signing the 1916 Manifesto of the Sixteen in support of the Allies of World War I. Near the end of his life, Cherkezov returned to London where he would continue to fight again for Georgia's independence, until his death in 1925.

References

Bibliography

External links
"Georgian independence petition 'found' in Oxford", BBC News, 25 May 2018

1846 births
1925 deaths
Anarcho-communists
Politicians from Tbilisi
Journalists from Tbilisi
Anarchists from Georgia (country)
Socialist Revolutionary Party politicians
Politicians of the Russian Empire
Georgian Socialist-Federalist Revolutionary Party politicians
Soviet anarchists